Tsotne Machavariani (born 26 September 1997) is a pistol shooter from Georgia. In 2016 he placed sixth in the 10 m air pistol event at the European championships.

Machavariani has an elder sister Nino; his father Gocha Machavariani is an officer with the Ministry of Internal Affairs of Georgia. Tsotne is trained by his mother Nino Salukvadze, who competed in pistol shooting in every Olympics since 1988. Machavariani and his mother competed together as a team at the 2015 European Games and placed 14th. In 2016 they become the first mother and son to qualify for the same Olympics.

References

Living people
1997 births
Male sport shooters from Georgia (country)
Shooters at the 2016 Summer Olympics
Olympic shooters of Georgia (country)
Shooters at the 2015 European Games
Shooters at the 2019 European Games
European Games medalists in shooting
European Games bronze medalists for Georgia (country)
21st-century people from Georgia (country)